Arquimedes (also Arquímedes) is a given name. Notable people with the name include:

 Arquímedes Arrieta (born 1918), Uruguayan boxer who competed in the 1936 Summer Olympics
 Arquimedes Caminero (born 1987), Dominican baseball pitcher
 Arquímedes Figuera (born 1989), Venezuelan footballer
 Arquímedes Herrera (1935–2013), Venezuelan track and field athlete
 Arquimedes Nieto (born 1989) Panamanian baseball player
 Arquimedes Reyes (born 1981), Salvadoran singer

See also
 Archimedes
 Arquimedes, a computer-aided design (CAD) program
 Arquimedez Pozo (born 1973), Dominican professional baseball player